2018 Big Ten tournament may refer to:

 2018 Big Ten Conference men's basketball tournament
 2018 Big Ten Conference women's basketball tournament
 2018 Big Ten Conference men's soccer tournament
 2018 Big Ten Conference women's soccer tournament
 2018 Big Ten Conference baseball tournament
 2018 Big Ten Conference softball tournament
 2018 Big Ten men's ice hockey tournament
 2018 Big Ten Conference men's lacrosse tournament
 2018 Big Ten Conference women's lacrosse tournament